Opava is a city in the Moravian-Silesian Region of the Czech Republic. It has about 55,000 inhabitants. It lies on the river Opava. Opava is one of the historical centres of Silesia. It was a historical capital of Czech Silesia.

Administrative division

Opava is made up of eight self-governing boroughs in the suburbs, and of central part which is administered directly. The city is further divided into 14 administrative parts (in brackets):
Opava (Město, Předměstí (larger part), Kateřinky, Kylešovice and Jaktař (larger part))
Komárov
Malé Hoštice
Milostovice
Podvihov (Komárovské Chaloupky and Podvihov)
Suché Lazce
Vávrovice (Vávrovice, Předměstí (smaller part) and Jaktař (smaller part))
Vlaštovičky
Zlatníky

Geography
Most of its territory is located in the Opava Hilly Land within the Silesian Lowlands, but it also extends to the Nízký Jeseník mountain range in the southeast and in the northwest.

Opava lies at the confluence of the Opava and Moravice rivers. The Opava River flows through the city centre.

Stříbrné Lake is an artificial lake on the outskirts of the city created by the flooding of the former gypsum mine. It is used for recreational purposes.

History

The first written mention of Opava is from 1195. In 1224, Opava received town privileges. After the Duchy of Troppau was established, Opava became its capital.

In 1427–1431, the duchy was ruled by the Hussites. In 1485, it was acquired by Matthias Corvinus and ruled by the Hungarians until 1526. In 1613, Karl I of Liechtenstein became Duke of Opava and merged the duchy with the Duchy of Krnov.

After the majority of Silesia was annexed by the Kingdom of Prussia during the War of the Austrian Succession after 1740, the remaining Silesian territory still under the control of the Habsburg monarchy became known as Austrian Silesia, with its capital in Opava (1742–1918). The Congress of Troppau took place here from 24 October to 23 December 1820.

According to the Austrian census of 1910, the town had 30,762 inhabitants, 29,587 of whom had permanent residence there. The census asked people for their native language, which showed that 27,240 (92%) were German-speaking, 2,039 (6.9%) were Czech-speaking and 274 (0.9%) were Polish-speaking. Jews were not allowed to declare Yiddish, and most of them thus declared German as their native language. The main religious group was Roman Catholics with 28,379 (92.2%), followed by Protestants with 1,155 (3.7%) and Jews with 1,112 (3.6%).

After the defeat of Austria-Hungary in World War I, Opava became part of Czechoslovakia in 1919.

In 1938, Opava was ceded to Nazi Germany as a result of the Munich agreement. It was administered as a part of Reichsgau Sudetenland. On April 22 1945, Opava was liberated by the Soviet Red Army at the cost of enormous war damage. In 1945–46, the German population was expelled under terms of Beneš decrees and the city was resettled with Czechs. On 1 January, the municipalities of Jaktař, Kateřinky and Kylešovice were joined to Opava. After the war, entire new residential areas and industrial plants were built.

While the Duchy of Opava has ceased to exist, the title of Duke of Troppau continues, with Hans-Adam II, Prince of Liechtenstein being the current incumbent.

Demographics

Economy
Opava is home especially to the engineering, food, paper and pharmaceutical industries. The largest company is Teva Czech Industries, a manufacturer of medicinal products, whose predecessor was founded in Opava in 1883. It employs about 1,600 people.

The largest non-industrial employers are the hospital and the psychiatric hospital.

Culture

Opava is an important cultural centre of Opavian Silesia. The Silesian Theatre in Opava was founded in 1805.

Education

Opava is home to the Silesian University, the only public university in the country not situated in a regional capital. It was established in 1991.

Sport
The city's football club SFC Opava currently plays in the Czech National Football League, the second tier of the Czech football league system.

Sights
One of the two main landmarks of Opava is the city hall on the Horní Square and its white tower, known as Hláska. A one-storey city hall and the tower were built in 1614–1618. However, the less representative town hall building around the tower was demolished in 1902 and replaced with a new one in Neo-Renaissance style.

The second landmark is the Co-cathedral of the Assumption of the Virgin Mary. It is the largest building in the Czech Republic, built in the so-called Silesian Brick Gothic style. A solid prismatic tower was built in the late 13th century and a higher south tower was built in the early 14th century, both towers were originally intended as part of a city hall. The church building between the towers dates from the mid-14th century. In 1996, the church became the second Episcopal church of the Ostrava-Opava diocese, and therefore a co-cathedral. With , the southern church tower is the highest tower in Silesia.

The Silesian Museum, founded in 1814, is the oldest public museum in the Czech Republic. It has about 2,400,000 exhibition items and is the third largest museum in the country.

Notable people

Martin of Opava (?–1278) historian and cleric
Johann Palisa (1848–1925), Austrian astronomer
Eduard von Böhm-Ermolli (1856–1941), Austrian field marshal
Joseph Maria Olbrich (1867–1908), Austrian architect
Petr Bezruč (1867–1958), poet
Max Eschig (1872–1927), French music publisher
Franz Bardon (1909–1958), occultist
Joy Adamson (1910–1980), naturalist and author
Helmut Niedermeyer (1926–2014), Austrian businessman
Josef Gebauer (1942–2004), historian
Boris Rösner (1951–2006), actor
Pavel Složil (born 1955), tennis player
Bohdan Sláma (born 1967), film director
Kamil Mrůzek (born 1977), kayaker
Nataša Novotná (born 1977), dancer and choreographer
Zdeněk Pospěch (born 1978), footballer
Zuzana Ondrášková (born 1980), tennis player
Libor Kozák (born 1989), footballer

Twin towns – sister cities

Opava is twinned with:

 Katowice, Poland 
 Kearney, United States
 Liptovský Mikuláš, Slovakia
 Racibórz, Poland
 Roth, Germany
 Zugló (Budapest), Hungary
 Żywiec, Poland

References

External links

Regional news
Old postcards 

 
Cities in Silesia
Cities and towns in the Czech Republic